Mexican Prince was the title created on June 22, 1822 by the Mexican Constituent Congress during the First Mexican Empire, to be granted to legitimate children who were not the heir or firstborn of the Emperor Agustín de Iturbide. This title went to the legitimate sons of Agustín de Iturbide and Ana María Huarte at the time of the decree. Later Felipe de Iturbide became a Mexican Prince at birth months later.

Decree 
The Sovereign Mexican Constituent Congress decreed on June 22, 1822 the following:

Art 1 °. The Mexican Monarchy, in addition to being moderate and Constitutional, is also hereditary.
Art 2 °. Consequently, the Nation calls the succession of the Crown for the death of the current Emperor, his firstborn son Don Agustín Jerónimo de Iturbide. The Constitution of the Empire will decide the order of succession of the throne.
Art 3 °. The crown prince will be called "Prince Imperial" and will have the treatment of Imperial Highness.
Art 4 °. The legitimate sons and daughters of H.I.M will be called "Mexican Princes", and will have the treatment of Highness.
Art 5 °. Don José Joaquín de Iturbide y Arreguí, Father of H.I.M, is decorated with the title of "Prince of the Union" and the treatment of Highness, during his life.
Art 6 °. It is also granted the title of "Princess of Iturbide" and the treatment of Highness, during his life, to Doña María Nicolasa de Iturbide y Arámburo, sister of the Emperor.

List of Mexican Princes

References 

Mexican Empire
Titles of nobility in the Americas